Huayu is a town of Jishan County, Shanxi, China. , it has 28 villages under its administration.

References

Township-level divisions of Shanxi
Jishan County